Moder is a surname. Notable people with the surname include:

 Daniel Moder (born 1969), American cinematographer
 Jakub Moder (born 1999), Polish footballer
 Jozef Móder (born 1947), Slovak footballer
 Ladislav Móder (1945–2006), Slovak footballer
 Mary Moder (1905–1993), American voice actress
 Matthias Moder (born 1963), East German hammer thrower
 Paul Moder (1896–1942), German Nazi politician and military officer
 Paul Moder (actor), Australian actor
 Rezső Móder (born 1954), Hungarian artist

See also